The Border League was the name of two 20th century circuits in North America minor league baseball. The first Border league operated in the 1912 and 1913 seasons as a Class D level league with five teams based in Michigan and  one in Ontario. The Border League resumed play from 1946 to 1951 as a Class C level minor league, with teams based in New York, Quebec and Ontario.

1912–1913 league in Michigan and Ontario
The first, also known as the Eastern Michigan League, was a Class D minor league in 1912 and 1913 at the Canada–US border. It was composed of five teams from Michigan and one from Windsor, Ontario. This six-team league never really got off the ground, playing a minimal 35 game schedule. The league lost one Michigan team that disbanded in 1913. This action helped cause the league's downfall. There was no known effort to organize the league in 1914.

1912–1913 cities and teams
Mount Clemens, Michigan: Mount Clemens Bathers 1912–1913
Port Huron, Michigan: Port Huron Independents 1912–1913
Pontiac, Michigan: Pontiac Indians 1912–1913
Windsor, Ontario: Windsor 1912–1913
Wyandotte, Michigan:Wyandotte Alkalis 1912–1913
Ypsilanti, Michigan: Ypsilanti 1913

1946–1951 league in New York, Ontario and Quebec
The name was revived for a post-World War II Class C circuit that operated from 1946 through 1951 before shutting down. It was represented by nine cities, five from across the Canada–US border (four from Ontario and one from Quebec) and four from the state of New York. The four New York, teams, along with the Kingston, Ontario, squad were able to make the full run. The Ottawa Senators entry won three of the league's six pennants.

The league proved to be a good solid competitive group for the first five years. Attendance was good, the league drew over 1,600,000 fans the first five years before finally disbanding on July 16, 1951.

1946–1951 cities and teams
Auburn, New York: Auburn Cayugas 1946–1950, Auburn Falcons 1951
Cornwall, Ontario: Cornwall Canadians 1951
Geneva, New York: Geneva Red Birds 1947, Geneva Robins 1948–1951
Granby, Quebec: Granby Red Sox 1946
Kingston, Ontario: Kingston Ponies 1946–1951
Ogdensburg, New York: Ogdensburg Maples 1946–1951
Ottawa, Ontario: Ottawa Nationals 1947, Ottawa Senators 1948–1949, Ottawa Nationals 1950
Sherbrooke, Quebec: Sherbrooke Canadians 1946
Watertown, New York: Watertown Athletics 1946–1951

Standings & statistics

1912 & 1913
1912 Border League
schedule
No Playoffs Scheduled. 

1913 Border League
schedule
Mount Clemens disbanded July 12. 
Home Runs: 4 players tied with 2 each.

1946 to 1951

1946 Border League
Playoffs: Kingston 3 games, Auburn 1. Watertown 3 games, Granby 1.  Finals: Watertown 4 games, Kingston 2. 

1947 Border League
schedule
Playoffs: Ottawa 4 games, Auburn 0. Ogdensburg 4 games, Watertown 3.  Finals: Ottawa 4 games, Ogdensburg 2. 

1948 Border League
schedule
Playoffs: Ogdensburg 4 games, Ottawa 1. Watertown 4 games, Geneva 3. Finals: Ogdensburg 4 games, Watertown 0. 

1949 Border League
schedule
Playoffs: Geneva 4 games, Ogdensburg 3. Auburn 4 games, Ottawa 3.  Finals: Geneva 4 games, Auburn 2. 

1950 Border League
schedule
Playoffs: Ottawa 4 games, Kingston 1. Ogdensburg 4 games, Watertown 1.  Finals: Ogdensburg 4 games, Ottawa 2. 

1951 Border League
Cornwall and Geneva disbanded June 26; Auburn and Watertown disbanded July 1. The league disbanded July 16. Last game played on July 10.

References

External links
 Baseball Reference

Defunct baseball leagues in Canada
Defunct minor baseball leagues in the United States
Baseball leagues in New York (state)
Baseball leagues in Michigan
Sports leagues established in 1912
Sports leagues disestablished in 1913
Sports leagues established in 1946
Sports leagues disestablished in 1951
1912 establishments in Michigan
1912 establishments in Ontario
1913 disestablishments in Michigan
1913 disestablishments in Ontario
1946 establishments in New York (state)
1946 establishments in Ontario
1946 establishments in Quebec
1951 disestablishments in New York (state)
1951 disestablishments in Ontario
1951 disestablishments in Quebec